is a Japanese manga series written by Yū Sanui and illustrated by Sumihito Itami. It was serialized in Shogakukan's seinen manga magazine Monthly Big Comic Spirits from January 2012 to June 2017.

Publication
Written by Yū Sanui and illustrated by Sumihito Itami, Kyōgaku Kōkou no Genjitsu was serialized in Shogakukan's seinen manga magazine Monthly Big Comic Spirits from January 27, 2012, to June 27, 2017. Shogakukan collected its chapters in seven tankōbon volumes, released from September 28, 2012, to December 12, 2017.

Volume list

References

External links
 

Comedy anime and manga
School life in anime and manga
Seinen manga
Shogakukan manga